is the second single by the Japanese pop girl group Berryz Kobo. It was released on April 28, 2004, and debuted at number 25 in the weekly Oricon singles chart.

Track listing 
 "Fighting Pose wa Date ja Nai!" (Music and lyrics: Tsunku. Arrangement: Takahashi Yuichi)
  (Music and lyrics: Tsunku. Arrangement: Takahashi Yuichi)
 "Fighting Pose wa Date ja Nai!" (Instrumental)

Music video versions 
 Normal version
 Dance-shot version
 Close-up version (group)

Charts

References

External links 
 Fighting Pose wa Date ja nai! entry on the Up-Front Works official website

2004 singles
Songs written by Tsunku
Berryz Kobo songs
Song recordings produced by Tsunku
2004 songs